Hach may refer to:

 Acylcarnitine hydrolase, enzyme that catalyses the hydrolysis of acylcarnitine
 Hach (surname), or people with that surname
 Hach Company, American company